Alexander Vladimirovich Semak (born February 11, 1966) is a Russian former professional ice hockey centre who played ten seasons in the Soviet League between 1982 and 1992 for Salavat Yulaev Ufa and HC Dynamo Moscow before moving to North America where he played six National Hockey League seasons from 1991–92 until 1996–97.  He played for the New Jersey Devils, New York Islanders, Tampa Bay Lightning and Vancouver Canucks.

Semak was drafted 207th overall by the New Jersey Devils in the 1988 NHL Entry Draft. He played 289 career NHL games, scoring 83 goals and 91 assists for 174 points. His best offensive season was the 1992–93 NHL season when he scored 37 goals and 42 assists for 79 points, all career-highs.

Career statistics

Regular season and playoffs

International

References

External links
 

1966 births
Albany River Rats players
HC Dynamo Moscow players
Living people
New Jersey Devils draft picks
New Jersey Devils players
New York Islanders players
Russian ice hockey players
Salavat Yulaev Ufa players
Severstal Cherepovets players
Soviet ice hockey centres
Sportspeople from Ufa
Tampa Bay Lightning players
Vancouver Canucks players